Alfred William Place (May 8, 1877 – September 19, 1955) was an American football player and coach, minister, and missionary.  He was the sixth head football coach at Buchtel College—now known as the University of Akron—helming the team for one season in 1903 and compiling a record of 0–2.  Place played college football as a halfback at the University of Chicago.  He was a missionary in Japan from 1907 to 1913.  Place died on September 19, 1955, at Methodist Hospital in Indianapolis, Indiana, from injuries he sustained while blasting  tree stumps on his farm near Mooresville, Indiana.

Head coaching record

References

External links
 

1877 births
1955 deaths
American football ends
American football halfbacks
American Christian missionaries
Akron Zips football coaches
Chicago Maroons football players
People from Wood County, Ohio
Accidental deaths in Indiana
Christian missionaries in Japan
Deaths by explosive device